Typhoon Wutip, known in the Philippines as Tropical Storm Paolo, was a typhoon that formed in the South China Sea from a tropical depression on September 27, 2013. In September 30, the storm made landfall on the provinces from Ha Tinh to Thua Thien Hue province of Vietnam, including Quang Binh is the center of the storm. Wutip killed at least 25 people in southeastern Asia during late September and early October.

The name "Wutip" (蝴蝶) proposed by Macau, meaning "butterfly" in Cantonese.

Meteorological history

A tropical disturbance formed from the southwest monsoon which was enhanced by Pabuk on September 23.

The system tracked west and strengthened into a tropical storm and named it Wutip (1321) on September 27 as it brought light to heavy rainfall across Luzon, Philippines. Tropical Storm Wutip became a severe tropical storm as it moved westwards on September 28, and rapidly became a typhoon.

On September 29, Wutip became a Moderate Typhoon as it created an eye towards Thailand.

Impact

China
A total of 14 people were killed in China, and total damages were amounted to be ¥20 million (US$3.27 million).

Vietnam
Storm made landfall in Quảng Bình Province on the afternoon of September 30, 2013 with winds of 11 Beauforts and gusts of 14 Beauforts (160 km/h). The storm made 500KV north-south line was separated from the grid without causing widespread power outages, 220 line kV, 110 kV and lower voltage lines in the north central area of failure, causing a power loss in Quảng Bình, Quảng Trị and Thừa Thiên–Huế as many trees, broken pole fell on the North–South Railway, leaving at least four trains paralyzed. Rain reached Vietnam on September 30 and then Thailand the following day.

2 people were killed when a radio tower serving the Voice of Vietnam in Quảng Bình fell on a car. Mr. Nguyen Tai Dung, deputy director of Nghe An Department of Agriculture was washed away, killed while on duty for flood relief in the town of Hoang Mai. Overall 13 people were killed, and total damage was estimated at ₫13.6 trillion (US$644 million).

See also

Typhoon Ketsana
Typhoon Xangsane
Typhoon Betty (1987)
Tropical Storm Mekkhala (2008)
Typhoon Doksuri (2017)

References

External links

JMA General Information of Typhoon Wutip (1321) from Digital Typhoon
JMA Best Track Data of Typhoon Wutip (1321) 
JTWC Best Track Data of Typhoon 20W (Wutip)
20W.WUTIP from the U.S. Naval Research Laboratory

2013 Pacific typhoon season

2013 disasters in the Philippines
Typhoons in the Philippines
Typhoons in Vietnam
2013 in Vietnam
Typhoons
Wutip